Beyond Fear: Thinking Sensibly About Security in an Uncertain World is a non-fiction book by Bruce Schneier, published in 2003. The book grew out of an Atlantic Monthly article by Charles Mann. Beyond Fear presents a five-step process for evaluating the value of a countermeasure against security attacks. The book is divided into three parts. Part one of Beyond Fear introduces the idea that all security involves "trade-offs". Part two: "How Security Works", explains key principles in security such as Attackers, Defenders, Identification, Authentication, and Authorization. Part three: "The Game of Security" ties all the issues together and offers suggestions on how to form a coherent security policy.

External links 
 Beyond Fear: Thinking Sensibly About Security in an Uncertain World. 

Current affairs books
2003 non-fiction books
Technology books